Auzeodes is a genus of moths in the family Geometridae.

Species
Listed from Catalogue of Life: 2011 Annual Checklist 
 Auzeodes chalybeata Walker, 1866
 Auzeodes coctata Warren, 1897
 Auzeodes nigroseriata Warren, 1893
 Auzeodes perculta Prout
 Auzeodes rufa Warren, 1897
 Auzeodes uniformis Warren, 1901

References

 Auzeodes at Markku Savela's Lepidoptera and Some Other Life Forms

Ennominae
Geometridae genera